Augusto de Jesus Corte Real Carneiro (born on 5 November 1995), known by his nickname Tó Carneiro, is an Angolan professional football player who plays for Petro de Luanda, and the Angolan national team.

He first appeared on 29 June 2017 at the 2017 COSAFA Championship held in South Africa where he played against Malawi in a 0–0 draw.

He also participated at the African Nations Championship.

On 11 October 2021, Tó Carneiro scored an own goal against Gabon during the 2022 FIFA World Cup qualification in a 2–0 defeat.

References

1995 births
Living people
Angolan footballers
Angola international footballers
G.D. Interclube players
Atlético Petróleos de Luanda players
Association football defenders
Angola A' international footballers
2018 African Nations Championship players
2022 African Nations Championship players